Hinsdale Central School is a Pre-K through Grade 12 school in Hinsdale, Cattaraugus County, New York, United States.  The school currently enrolls around 500 students.

The school's colors are royal blue, white and grey..

Athletics 
Hinsdale Central School's mascot is the Bobcat. The women's teams, like many other schools, implements 'Lady' into their name and thus are known as the Lady Bobcats.

The school's football team program was cancelled prior to the 1999 season due to a loss in numbers. The program officially restarted in 2006, with the return of local football coach legend Rod Rohl. However, with the inexperience of the team, they only posted a 1–7 record. Their lone win came in Week One against their New York State Route 16 rival, the Archbishop Walsh Eagles. However, the team would do much better in their second season, in 2007. The Bobcats went on the sectional finals, only to lose to the Portville Panthers. However, they stayed in the Class DD playoffs, and played in Jamestown against the Pine Valley Panthers. They lost, and were runners-up in the 2007 Class DD. The school nearly cancelled its 2008 season, but were able to scrape up just enough to play. After the 2008 season football in the historical district was officially shut down due to lack of numbers.

Football was not the only program to struggle with numbers in recent Bobcat history. The school's soccer program also had faltering numbers in previous years, barely able to field a team for the 2007 campaign. They were coached by Chuck Massaro. The team was winless in this season, and are expected to struggle again with numbers in 2008. (Football and soccer are played during the same fall season in New York, and both squads had to compete for talent from the same small pool of students.)

In 2008, the men's soccer program started 0-7-0, but were not defeated for the first time since 2005 in a 2–2 draw with Panama Central School. After not fielding a team during the 2009 season through 2013 young talents started to shine in the community and won three games in the 2012 season. The Bobcats basketball team in 2012 won their first game after losing 34 straight. In the 2013–2014 season the Bobcats are coming off of one of their most productive seasons in 5 years. The Hinsdale Bobcat Baseball program has come a long way after reaching the Quarterfinals in the past two seasons losing by 1 run in each of the two playoff games both in which were very talented baseball programs from Rochester. Through 2013 the bobcats posted a total of 13 wins in 32 games which is a huge jump for the program after losing significant talent.

References

External links
 School website

Public elementary schools in New York (state)
Public high schools in New York (state)
Public middle schools in New York (state)
Schools in Cattaraugus County, New York